
Gmina Trzydnik Duży is a rural gmina (administrative district) in Kraśnik County, Lublin Voivodeship, in eastern Poland.

Villages
Gmina Trzydnik Duży contains the villages and settlements of Agatówka, Budki, Dąbrowa, Dębowiec, Liśnik Mały, Łychów Gościeradowski, Łychów Szlachecki, Olbięcin, Owczarnia, Rzeczyca Księża, Rzeczyca Ziemiańska, Rzeczyca Ziemiańska-Kolonia, Trzydnik Duży, Trzydnik Duży-Kolonia, Trzydnik Mały, Węglin, Węglinek, Wola Trzydnicka, Wólka Olbięcka and Zielonka.

Neighbouring gminas
Gmina Trzydnik Duży is bordered by the gminas of Dzierzkowice, Gościeradów, Kraśnik, Potok Wielki, Szastarka and Zaklików.

References

Polish official population figures 2006

Trzydnik Duzy
Kraśnik County